This is a list of German television related events from 1992.

Events
30 March - Wind are selected to represent Germany at the 1992 Eurovision Song Contest with their song "Träume sind für alle da". They are selected to be the thirty-seventh German Eurovision entry during Ein Lied für Malmö held at the Stadthalle Magdeburg in Magdeburg.

Debuts

Domestic
5 January - Unser Lehrer Doktor Specht (1992–1999) (ZDF)
7 January - Regina auf den Stufen (1992) (ZDF)
11 May - Gute Zeiten, schlechte Zeiten (1992–present) (RTL)
1 October - Marienhof (1992–2011) (ARD)
28 October - Freunde fürs Leben (1992–2001) (ZDF)
26 December - By Way of the Stars (1992) (ZDF)

International
22 February -  Gophers! (1990) (RTL)
10 March -  Samurai Pizza Cats (1991) (RTLplus)
3 April - / Widget (1990–1991) (ProSieben)
4 April -  TaleSpin (1990–1991) (Das Erste)
11 April -  Captain Planet and the Planeteers (1991–1996) (RTLplus)
4 July -  Beverly Hills 90210 (1990–2000) (RTL)
21 November -  Bob in a Bottle (1991) (RTLplus)
// Fantastic Max (1988–1990) (Tele 5)
 Darkwing Duck (1991–1992) (Das Erste)
 The Dreamstone (1990–1995) (SWR Fernsehen)
Unknown -  Murphy Brown (1988-1998) (Unknown)

Armed Forces Network
 Darkwing Duck (1991–1992)
 Wish Kid (1991)
 Lamb Chop's Play-Along (1992–1995)

BFBS
14 January -  The Chestnut Soldier (1991)
16 January -  Johnson and Friends (1990–1997)
31 January -  Goodbye Cruel World (1992)
4 February -  Truckers (1992)
6 February -  Brum (1991-1994, 2001–2002)
11 February -  Archer's Goon (1992)
21 February -  The Cloning of Joanna May (1992)
22 February -  Hangar 17 (1992–1994)
24 February -  Joshua Jones (1992)
25 February - / Heroes II: The Return (1991)
30 April -  Just So Stories (1992)
5 May -  Spider! (1991)
6 July -  Wail of the Banshee (1992)
8 July -  The Torch (1992)
9 July -  Gravedale High (1990)
19 August -  Me, You and Him (1992)
20 August - / Frankie's House (1992)
3 September -  Wilderness Edge (1992)
29 September -  The Worst Day of My Life (1991)
13 October -  Noddy's Toyland Adventures (1992–1999)
14 October -  Follow Your Nose (1992)
16 November - / Funnybones (1992)
16 November -  Puppydog Tales (1992)

Television shows

1950s
Tagesschau (1952–present)

1960s
 heute (1963-present)

1970s
 heute-journal (1978-present)
 Tagesthemen (1978-present)

1980s
Wetten, dass..? (1981-2014)
Lindenstraße (1985–present)

Ending this year

Births

Deaths